Stenopterygiidae are a family of the Ichthyosauria, a group of extinct marine reptiles that superficially resemble fish. They are distinguished from other ichthyosaurs by the arrangement of the flipper bones and by the broad attachment of the fins to the body.

References

Further reading
 Long, J.A., Dinosaurs of Australia & New Zealand, UNSW Press, Australia 1998

Jurassic ichthyosaurs